Hans Feige (10 November 1880 – 17 September 1953) was a German General of the Infantry in the Wehrmacht during World War II.

Career
Feige joined the German Army in 1900. During World War I he served mainly in General Staff positions of various formations. He was wounded twice in the war and received several awards like both classes of the Iron Cross. After the war he joined the Freikorps until he was accepted into the Reichswehr. Here again he mostly served in staff positions and was promoted to Generalmajor on 1 October 1931 and to Generalleutnant 2 years later. On 1 October 1933 he took command of the 1st Cavalry Division, which was disbanded in 1935. He successively entered retirement in 1935, as General of the Infantry.

At the onset of World War II he was recalled into active service and took over command of the XXXVI Corps in May 1940. His unit subsequently participated in the Fall of France in the Lorraine region. The corps was then transferred to Norway. In preparation for Operation Barbarossa the corps moved into central Finland. When the German offensive was launched on 22 June 1941, his unit was together with the Finnish III Corps tasked to recapture Salla and cut Murmansk off from the rest of Russia by advancing eastwards during Operation Arctic Fox. Although Salla was recaptured, the advance of his ill-equipped forces stalled soon. Feige was pressured by von Falkenhorst, commander of Army Norway, to continue the offensive, which met with little results. The offensive was finally called off on 17 September 1941. In November he was withdrawn from his command and replaced by Karl Weisenberger as commander of XXXVI Corps. He subsequently was placed into the Führerreserve and never took over an active command again. As result of this inactivity he finally retired on 30 June 1942.

Awards and decorations
 Iron Cross of 1914, 1st and 2nd class
 German Cross in Gold
 Grand Cross of the Order of the White Rose of Finland with swords

References

Bibliography

 
 

1880 births
1953 deaths
Military personnel from Königsberg
German Army generals of World War II
Generals of Infantry (Wehrmacht)
Prussian Army personnel
German Army personnel of World War I
Recipients of the Gold German Cross
Recipients of the Hanseatic Cross (Lübeck)
Recipients of the clasp to the Iron Cross, 1st class
20th-century Freikorps personnel
Lieutenant generals of the Reichswehr